This is a list of seasons played by Beitar Jerusalem Football Club in Israeli and European football, from 1936 (when the club first started to form) to the most recent completed season. It details the club's achievements in major competitions, and the top scorers for each season. Top scorers in bold were also the top scorers in the Israeli league that season.

The club has won the League Championship six times, the State Cup seven times and the Toto Cup two times.

History
Beitar Jerusalem Football Club was established in 1936 in the city of Jerusalem. Beitar is the only Israeli team that won the PeaceCup in 2001 after win A.S. Roma 1–0.

This is a list of seasons played by Beitar Jerusalem Football Club in Israeli and European football, from 1945–46 (when the club first competed in the cup) to the most recent completed season. It details the club's achievements in major competitions, and the top scorers for each season. Top scorers in bold were also the top scorers in the Israeli league that season. Records of minor competitions such as the Lilian Cup are not included due to them being considered of less importance than the State Cup and the Toto Cup.

History
Beitar Jerusalem was established in 1936, and initially played in the Jerusalem area only, due to travel difficulties. In 1946 the club first played in a national tournament, and joined Liga Bet the following season, although the club withdrew shortly after the season started. The club was first promoted to the top division in 1954, spending one season at the top division before immediately dropping back to the second division. The club returned to the top division in 1968, and it played at the top division ever since, with the exception of two seasons. The club won its first major trophy in 1976, winning the State Cup, and its first championship in 1987. In total, the club won 6 league championships, 7 State Cups and 2 Toto Cups

Seasons

Key

 P = Played
 W = Games won
 D = Games drawn
 L = Games lost
 F = Goals for
 A = Goals against
 Pts = Points
 Pos = Final position

 Leumit = Liga Leumit (National League)
 Artzit = Liga Artzit (Nationwide League)
 Premier = Liga Al (Premier League)
 Pal. League = Palestine League

 F = Final
 Group = Group stage
 QF = Quarter-finals
 QR1 = First Qualifying Round
 QR2 = Second Qualifying Round
 QR3 = Third Qualifying Round
 QR4 = Fourth Qualifying Round
 RInt = Intermediate Round

 R1 = Round 1
 R2 = Round 2
 R3 = Round 3
 R4 = Round 4
 R5 = Round 5
 R6 = Round 6
 SF = Semi-finals

Notes

References

Beitar Jerusalem F.C.
 
Beitar Jerusalem
Beitar